Micomeseng is a city in Equatorial Guinea. It is located in the province of Kié-Ntem and has a (2005 est.) population of 5813.

Populated places in Kié-Ntem